A Wasteland Companion is the seventh studio album from M. Ward, released in Australia and New Zealand on April 6, 2012; in the United Kingdom on April 9, 2012; and in the United States on April 10, 2012. A Wasteland Companion is the follow-up to his 2009 album Hold Time.

A Wasteland Companion was recorded in eight studios in the United States and the United Kingdom. M. Ward promoted the new album on his 2012 European and American tour, March 20 to May 24.

The album garnered a rating of 75 out of 100 from critics as compiled by Metacritic.

Track listing
 "Clean Slate" - 2:51
 "Primitive Girl" - 3:10
 "Me and My Shadow" - 2:36
 "Sweetheart" (Daniel Johnston) - 3:31
 "I Get Ideas" - 2:39
 "The First Time I Ran Away" - 3:17
 "A Wasteland Companion" - 2:54
 "Watch the Show" - 3:40
 "There's a Key" - 2:57
 "Crawl After You" - 3:41
 "Wild Goose" - 2:35
 "Pure Joy" - 2:57

Personnel
 M. Ward – guitar, piano, vocals
 Zooey Deschanel – vocals
 Susan Sanchez – backing vocals
 Rachel Cox – backing vocals
 Toby Leaman – bass
 Tyler Tornfelt – bass
 Mike Coykendall – percussion, bass, acoustic guitar
 John Parish – percussion, marimba
 Jordan Hudson – percussion
 Steve Shelley – percussion
 Scott McPherson – percussion
 John Graboff – pedal steel
 Howe Gelb – piano
 Nathan Jr. Andersen – piano
 Mike Mogis – organ, orchestra bells
 Tom Hagerman – strings
 Amanda Lawrence – violin

Charts

References

M. Ward albums
2012 albums